Protein CASC3 is a protein that in humans is encoded by the CASC3 gene.

Function 

The product of this gene is a core component of the exon junction complex (EJC), a protein complex that is deposited on spliced mRNAs at exon-exon junctions and functions in nonsense-mediated mRNA decay (NMD). The encoded protein binds RNA and interacts with two other EJC core components. It is predominantly located in the cytoplasm, but shuttles into the nucleus where it localizes to nuclear speckles.

References

External links

Further reading